Asterix (foaled 10 November 2018) is New Zealand racehorse, best known for an upset victory in the 147th running of the New Zealand Derby.

Background

Asterix is a bay gelding by the former Cambridge Stud stallion Tavistock, who became widely known as a remarkable sire of classic winners. He had previously been represented by two Victoria Derby winners (Tarzino and Johnny Get Angry), along with winners of the Australian Derby (Tavago), Rosehill Guineas (Volkstok'n'barrell), Hong Kong Derby (Werther) and Singapore Derby (Infantry).

Asterix was bred by Sir Owen Glenn's Go Bloodstock, and he was bought for NZ$450,000 at the 2020 New Zealand Bloodstock Ready to Run Sale by bloodstock agent Bruce Perry. Asterix races in the colours of the Kelt family, which had previously been carried to Derby victory by Popsy in 1993. Former New Zealand international cricketer Mark Greatbatch also shares in the ownership.

Racing career

Asterix is trained by Lance O'Sullivan and Andrew Scott, who also won the 2021 New Zealand Derby with Rocket Spade. Asterix made his debut less than two months before his Derby triumph, finishing sixth in a 1400-metre race at Matamata on January 12. An eighth placing followed at Te Rapa on February 2, before Asterix stepped up to 2100 metres and recorded a maiden victory at Tauranga on February 16.

The Derby was only two weeks after that victory and represented a massive rise in class, with Asterix among the outsiders at 45-to-one. But he produced a powerful performance, swooping forward from last to lodge his bid at the top of the home straight and sprinting clear for a comfortable victory over hot favourite La Crique.

See also

 2022 New Zealand Derby

References 

Racehorses bred in New Zealand
Racehorses trained in New Zealand
2018 racehorse births